The Maitreya Project is an international organisation, operating since 1990,
which intends to construct statues of Maitreya Buddha in India and perhaps elsewhere. Initial plans were for a 152-metre (500 ft) colossal statue, to be built in either Kushinagar or Bodhgaya. These plans have since changed, and the Maitreya Project now intends to construct relatively modest statues in both towns. The project was initiated by the Foundation for the Preservation of the Mahayana Tradition, an organisation within the Gelug school of Tibetan Buddhism.

Jessica Marie Falcone's Battling the Buddha of Love: A Cultural Biography of the Greatest Statue Never Built (Cornell University Press, 2018; based on her Ph.D. dissertation in cultural anthropology for Cornell) is about controversy over the planned statue between FPMT participants and Kushinagari farmers, and the meaning of the statue to both sides.

Laying of the foundation stone in Kushinagar

The land is immediately adjacent to the Parinirvana Temple denoting the place where Buddha Shakyamuni passed into Parinirvana, and the Rambhar Stupa which marks the holy site of Buddha’s cremation.

On that same day, the Chief Minister of Uttar Pradesh, Akhilesh Yadav, presided over a foundation stone laying ceremony on this land. Maitreya Project's Spiritual Director, Lama Zopa Rinpoche and the Board of Trustees of the Maitreya Project Trust attended as state guests.

Finances

The Project reports for 1990–2008 outgoings of more than US$20 million and investment of more than US$11 million.

Nita Ing has taken over responsibility for the funding of the statue in Bodhgaya.

Criticism
Peter Kedge, former Director and CEO of the Maitreya Project has posted a number of replies to these criticisms.

Following the 1,262nd day of "peaceful dharna", in August 2010, by the majority of local farmers against the compulsory acquisition of their farms, the Cabinet Secretary of Uttar Pradesh announced a reconsideration of support for the Project.

References

Academic Papers
Falcone, Jessica. 2011. “The Buddhist Lama and the Indian Farmer: Negotiating Modernity and Tradition in the Development Plans for Kushinagar, India.” In Inequality in a Globalizing World: Perspectives, Processes, and Experiences, edited by Sangeeta Parashar Nandikotkur and Yong Wang, 107-117. Dubuque, IA: Kendall-Hunt Publishing.

External links

Maitreya Project page of the FPMT website
Videos posted on YouTube by Maitreya Project
BBC Documentary
Pepper, Daniel Giant Buddha's tough love will drive out poor The Scotsman, 9 September 2007 on The Buddhist Channel
Aros Architects Kushingar Masterplan with location map and simulated aerial view
Fearing unrest, UP govt scales down Maitreya Buddha project Indian Express, Thu 26 May 2011.

Colossal Buddha statues
Indian art
Foundation for the Preservation of the Mahayana Tradition
Proposed statues in India
Buddhism in India
Statues in Uttar Pradesh
Colossal statues in India
Maitreya